In a Million Pieces is the sole full-length album by  The Draft. It was released in 2006 on Epitaph Records, and was the first new music released by members of Hot Water Music following that band's hiatus earlier that year.

Track listing
 "New Eyes Open" - 3:38
 "Lo Zee Rose" - 3:13
 "Let It Go" - 2:57
 "Alive or Dead" - 2:45
 "Bordering" - 3:19
 "Impossible" - 3:37
 "Wired" - 2:39
 "Not What I Wanna Do" - 3:06
 "All We Can Count On" - 2:40
 "Out of Tune" - 2:56
 "Longshot" - 2:53
 "The Tide is Out" - 3:09

References

2006 albums
Epitaph Records albums